Jasmine Denise Richards (born June 28, 1990) is a Canadian former actress and singer. She is best known for portraying Margaret "Peggy" Dupree in the  Camp Rock series, as well as Margaret Browning-Levesque in the Family Channel sitcom Naturally, Sadie and Judge Tara in Overruled!.

Life and career 
Richards was born in Scarborough, Ontario to immigrants from Barbados. She moved to Oakville at the age of 1. She went to Iroquois Ridge High School.

She became interested in acting at 11 years old, getting an acting job at her first open audition. Richards made her first introduction as a chlid star, playing Shakira in the television series Timeblazers. She starred as Alice Hope, the lead character, in the 2005 independent film Devotion. From 2005 to 2007, Richards then played Margaret Browning-Levesque in the Canadian television series Naturally, Sadie along with Charlotte Arnold. In the U.S., Richards also appeared in many of Disney Channel's Express Yourself segments with her Naturally, Sadie co-stars.

In 2007, Richards made an appearance in the television series Da Kink in My Hair. In 2008, Richards appeared in the ABC Family television film Princess. The same year, Richards also appeared in the Disney Channel Original Movie Camp Rock as Margaret "Peggy" Dupree. In 2010, Richards returned to reprise her role as Peggy in Camp Rock 2: The Final Jam, a sequel to Camp Rock. In the first Camp Rock film, she performed the song "Here I Am". However, her singing voice was recorded by Renee Sandstrom.

Filmography

Discography 
Soundtrack albums:

 2010: Camp Rock 2: The Final Jam

Songs:

 2009: "Forgotten (Demo)" from Music Myspace Page
 2009: "Praise Waiteth for Thee" from Music Myspace Page
 2009: "Overruled! Theme Song" from Overruled!
 2009: "All Right Now" from Overruled!
 2011: "You Have the Power" with Thomas L.

References

External links 
 
 

1990 births
21st-century Canadian actresses
Actresses from Toronto
Black Canadian actresses
Canadian child actresses
Canadian film actresses
Canadian people of Barbadian descent
Canadian television actresses
Living people
Musicians from Toronto
People from Oakville, Ontario
People from Scarborough, Toronto
21st-century Canadian women singers